Israel ben Eliezer (1698 – 22 May 1760), known as the Baal Shem Tov or as the Besht, was a Jewish mystic and healer who is regarded as the founder of Hasidic Judaism. "Besht" is the acronym for Baal Shem Tov, which means "Master of the Good Name," a term for a magician who wields the secret name of God.

The little biographical information about the Besht comes from oral traditions handed down by his students (Jacob Joseph of Polonne and others) and from the legendary tales about his life and behavior collected in Shivḥei ha-Besht (In Praise of the Ba'al Shem Tov; Kapust and Berdychiv, 1814–15).

A central tenet in the Baal Shem Tov's teaching is the direct connection with the divine, "dvekut", which is infused in every human activity and every waking hour. Prayer is of supreme importance, along with the mystical significance of Hebrew letters and words. His innovation lies in "encouraging worshippers to follow their distracting thoughts to their roots in the divine." Those who follow his teachings regard him as descended from the Davidic line that traces its lineage to the royal house of David.

Biography

Early years

Yisroel (Israel) was born to poor parents Eliezer and Sarah in a settlement near Okopy, Ternopil Oblast, a newly built fortress close to Kameniec in West Ukraine, where Zbruch connects with Dniester. Today, Okopy is a village in Chortkiv Raion (district) of Ternopil Oblast.

He died in Medzhybizh, which was part of Poland and today is situated in the Khmelnytskyi Oblast (Ukraine) (not to be confused with other cities of the same name).

In 1703, Israel became an orphan, and was adopted by the Jewish community of Tluste (near Zalischyky).  It is reported that, after the conclusion of his studies at the local cheder (Jewish elementary school), he would often wander into the fields and forests that surrounded the village. In 1710, he finished cheder and became an assistant to a melamed (instructor in cheder). In 1711 at the age of 13/14 he entered the chaburas machane yisroel a group of hidden tzaddikim lead by Rabbi Adam Baal Shem. Sometime in 1712 Israel became a shammash (sexton) of the local synagogue.

He was hired as a teacher's assistant in the cheders of the small villages through which they passed. He later related that he took great pleasure in accompanying the children to and from school, using this opportunity to recite prayers with them and tell them Torah stories. The Mezritcher Maggid, the Baal Shem Tov's successor, would later say, "If only we kissed a Torah scroll with the same love that my master [the Baal Shem Tov] kissed the children when he took them to cheder as a teacher's assistant!"

According to Hasidic legend, the Baal Shem Tov would have visions in which the prophet Achiya Hashiloni would appear to him. In 1716 the Baal Shem Tov married, but soon his wife died and he went on travelling throughout Eastern Galicia. After serving for a long time as a helper in various small communities of West Ukraine, he settled as a melamed at Tluste.

The Besht was introduced to Kabbalah by Rabbi Adam Baal Shem of Ropczyce who was a disciple of Rabbi Yoel Baal Shem (I) of Zamość, the successor of Rabbi Eliyahu Baal Shem of Worms.

The Besht became the leader of this movement at the age of 18. Caring for the Jewish poor, the group of Tzadikim encouraged Jews to move to agrarian lifestyles as alternatives to the chronic poverty of city Jews. In continuation of this policy, they decided that they needed to look after the educational needs of the children living in small farm communities. If a suitable teacher could not be sourced they themselves would provide one, and therefore the Baal Shem Tov became a teacher's assistant. He later commented "The most joyous time in my life was teaching the small children how to say Modeh Ani, Shema Yisrael and Kametz Alef Ah".

He was chosen by people conducting suits against each other to act as their arbitrator and mediator. His services were brought into frequent requisition because the Jews had their own civil courts in Poland.  He is said to have made such an impression on Ephraim of Brody that the latter promised the Besht his daughter Chana in marriage. The man died, however, without telling his daughter of her betrothal; but when she heard of her father's wishes, she agreed to comply with them.

After their marriage, the couple moved to a village in the Carpathians between Kuty and Kassowa,  where their only income was from his work digging clay and lime, which his wife delivered to surrounding villages.  The couple had two children: Udl (born in 1720) and Zvi Hersh. A maternal great-grandson of Baal Shem Tov and his wife was Reb Nachman of Breslov whose paternal ancestry came from (according to Hasidic tradition), the Maharal's family descended patrilineally from the Babylonian Exilarchs (during the era of the geonim) and therefore also from the Davidic dynasty.

Leadership
The Besht later took a position as a shohet (ritual butcher) in Kshilowice, near Iaslowice, which he soon gave up in order to manage a village tavern that his brother-in-law bought for him. During the many years that he lived in the woods and came into contact with the peasants, he had learned how to use plants for healing purposes. In fact, his first appearance in public was that of an  “ordinary” Baal Shem. He wrote amulets and prescribed cures.

After many trips in Podolia and Volhynia as a Baal Shem, Besht, considering his following large enough and his authority established, decided about 1740 to expound his teachings in the shtetl of Medzhybizh and people, mostly from the spiritual elite, came to listen to him. Medzhybizh became the seat of the movement and of the Medzybizh Hasidic dynasty. His following gradually increased and with it the hostility of the Talmudists. Nevertheless, Besht was supported at the beginning of his career by two prominent Talmudists, the brothers Meïr (chief rabbi of Lemberg and later Ostroha, and author of Meir Netivim (a work of halachic responsa) and other works) and Isaac Dov Margalios. Later he won over recognized rabbinic authorities who became his disciples and attested to his scholarship. These include Rabbi Yaakov Yosef Hakohen, rabbi of Polnoy; Rabbi Dovid Halperin, rabbi of Ostroha; Rabbi Israel of Satinov, author of Tiferet Yisrael; Rabbi Yoseph Heilperin of Slosowitz; and  Rabbi Dov Ber of Mezrich (AKA the Maggid of Mezritch). It is chiefly due to the latter that Besht's doctrines (though in an essentially altered form) were introduced into learned Jewish religious circles.

Israel undertook journeys in which he is recorded as effecting cures and expelling demons and evil spirits (shedim).  Later Hasidic tradition, however, downplayed the importance of these healing and magical practices, concentrating on his teachings, his charm, magnetism, and ecstatic personality.

Over the past few years, the "Agudas Ohalei Tzadikim" organization (based in Israel) has restored many graves of Tzadikim (Ohelim) in Ukraine, including the Baal Shem Tov's. A guesthouse and synagogue are located next to the Ohel of Baal Shem Tov, and the Baal Shem Tov's synagogue in the village proper has been painstakingly restored. Both synagogues are used by the many visitors from all over the world who come to pray near the Baal Shem Tov's grave.

Disputes with the Frankists 
The Besht took sides with the Talmudists in their disputes against the Frankists (Jacob Frank's cultist movement which regarded Frank as the Messiah, modelled after Sabbatai Zevi.) After the mass conversion of the Frankists, the Baal Shem Tov allegedly said that as long as a diseased limb is connected with the body, there is hope that it may be saved; but, once amputated, it is gone, and there is no hope. It is alleged that he died out of grief that the Frankists left Judaism.

Legacy

Israel ben Eliezer left no books; for the Kabbalistic commentary on Psalm 107, ascribed to him (Zhitomir, 1804), Sefer mi-Rabbi Yisrael Baal Shem-tov, may not be genuine. Therefore, the most reliable record of his teachings is in his utterances as recorded in the works of his disciples (Hasidim). Most are found in the works of Rabbi Jacob Joseph of Polnoy. But since Hasidism, immediately after the death of its founder, was divided into various parties, each claiming for itself the authority of Besht, the utmost of caution is necessary for judging as to the authenticity of utterances ascribed to Besht.

Some direct historical evidence remains of the Besht during the days he lived in Medzhybizh. Rosman discovered numerous legal documents that shed light on this period from the Polish Czartoryski noble family archives. The Besht's house is mentioned on several tax registers where it is recorded as having tax-free status. Several of the Besht's colleagues in his stories from Shivhei HaBesht also appear in Polish court records, notably, Ze'ev Wolf Kitzes and Dovid Purkes. Rosman contends that the Polish documents show the Besht and his followers were not outcasts or pariahs, but rather a respected part of mainstream Jewish communal life.

Other direct evidence includes the Besht's daily prayer-book (siddur, owned by the Agudas Chabad Library in New York) with his handwritten personal notes in the margins. His grave can be seen today in the old Jewish cemetery in Medzhybizh.

Chapin and Weinstock contend that the Besht was essentially the right person, in the right place, at the right time. 18th century Podolia was an ideal place to foster a sea-change in Jewish thinking. It had been depopulated one generation earlier due to the Khmelnitsky Massacres. A Turkish occupation of Podolia occurred within the Besht's lifetime and along with it the influence within this frontier territory of Sabbatai Zevi and his latter day spiritual descendants such as Malach and Jacob Frank. Once the Polish Magnates regained control from the Turks, Podolia went through an economic boom. The Magnates were benevolent to the economic benefits the Jews provided, and encouraged Jewish resettlement to help protect the frontier from future invasions. Thus, the Jewish community itself was essentially starting over. Within this context, the Jews of Podolia were open to new ideas. The Besht's refreshing new approaches to Judaism were welcome, expanding with little resistance in a community hungry for change.

Practices
The Besht was a mystic who claimed to have achieved devekut (“adhesion”), meaning that his soul had reached the high level where he could "ascend" to heaven and speak with any soul in heaven that he wished to speak to (though his only recorded choice was of the Messiah, and only once), and intervene between humans and God. He had the ability to protect the Jewish community from plague and persecution. He did this through prayer.

According to a letter from the Besht's brother-in-law to the Besht himself—as interpreted by Moshe Rosman— the latter was a practitioner of prophecy, being able to see a messianic figure arrive in Jerusalem despite living far from the city; the brother-in-law claims to have inquired into the figure and discovered the Besht's vision to be true. This claim also supports the supposed belief that the Besht had the ability to see the souls of men, divining the messianic quality of the man despite only seeing him through a vision. Rosman also describes another letter written by the brother-in-law which claims that the Besht could travel to heaven and commune with God. This view is derived from a series of titles given to the Besht, attributing various religious achievements to him such as understanding the mysteries of God. Similarly, Rosman—though now citing the writings of a Polish rabbi—says that it was believed the Besht was a great medical practitioner with vast knowledge regarding salves, balms, and similar medicants. Some aspects of his medical practice are said to have been mystic in nature, though the degree to which this is the case is not agreed upon. Some claim that the Besht could only heal others through prayer and similar acts: recitation of holy words. In other works, he is said to have fewer limitations on his supposed ability, allowing for more mystic methods to be practised.

He ate farfel every Friday night because the word was similar to the world farfalen which means "wiped out, over and finished". He considered the noodles a symbol marking the beginning of a new week.

Core doctrines

Although the teachings of the Ba’al Shem Tov derive to some extent from the Kabbalah and frequently employ kabbalistic terminology, he added emphasis on personal existence and the salvation of the soul of the individual, as a requirement for the redemption of the world: “For before one prays for general redemption one must pray for the personal salvation of one’s own soul” (Toledot Ya’akov Yosef).  He emphasised the personal against a previous preoccupation on messianism.  In a letter to Abraham Gershon (dated 1751),  he describes his dialogue with the Messiah during a spiritual ascent on Rosh Ha-Shanah, 1747: “I asked the Messiah, ‘When will you come, master,’ and he answered me, ‘When your learning will be made known and revealed to the world and its source will spread and all can recite yiḥudim and experience spiritual ascent as you can…’ and I was astonished and deeply grieved by this, and wondered when this would come to pass” (Ben Porat Yosef).

At the core of the Besht's teaching is the principle of devekut, and he demanded that devekut exist in all daily acts and in social contacts. Man must worship God not only when practicing religious acts and holy deeds, but also in his daily affairs, in his business, and in social contacts, for when a “man is occupied with material needs, and his thought cleaves to God, he will be blessed” (Ketonet Passim (1866), 28a).  This belief is linked with the Lurianic doctrine of the raising of the holy sparks (niẓoẓot), though he limited this concept to the salvation of the individual soul.  Because of his emphasis on devekut, he did not advocate withdrawal from daily life and society, and he  vigorously opposed fasts and asceticism.

He believed that physical pleasure can give rise to spiritual pleasure.  A physical act can become a religious act if it is performed as worship of God and the act is performed in a state of devekut.

The study of the Torah is of prime importance in his teachings, although he  interpreted the traditional ideal of “Torah for its own sake” as “for the sake of the letter.”  Through contemplation of the letters of the text, man can open the divine worlds before him.  He based this belief on the assumption that the letters of the Torah evolved and descended from a heavenly source, and therefore by contemplating the letters, one can restore them to their spiritual, and divine source. The student thus becomes joined to their higher forms and receives mystical revelations.

Similarly, through prayer, a man can reach devekut and contact with the divine, by concentrating on the mystical meaning of the letters:
According to what I learned from my master and teacher, the main occupation of Torah and prayer is that one should attach oneself to the spirituality of the light of the Ein Sof found in the letters of the Torah and prayer, which is called study for its own sake

The Besht's concept of the zaddik is of the existence of superior individuals whose spiritual qualities are greater than those of other human beings and who are outstanding in their higher level of devekut. These individuals influence society, and their task is to teach the people to worship God by means of devekut and to lead sinners to repent.

Influence on Hasidism
The later developments of Hasidism are unintelligible without consideration of Besht's opinion concerning man's proper relation with the universe. True worship of God, consists of the cleaving to, and the unification with, God. To use his own words, “the ideal of man is to be a revelation himself, clearly to recognize himself as a manifestation of God.” Mysticism, he said, is not the Kabbalah, which everyone may learn; but that sense of true oneness, which is usually as strange, unintelligible, and incomprehensible to mankind as dancing is to a dove. However, the man who is capable of this feeling is endowed with a genuine intuition, and it is the perception of such a man which is called prophecy, according to the degree of his insight. From this it results, in the first place, that the ideal man may lay claim to authority equal, in a certain sense, to the authority of the Prophets. This focus on oneness and personal revelation help earn his mystical interpretation of Judaism the title of Panentheism.

A second and more important result of the doctrine is that through his oneness with God, man forms a connecting link between the Creator and creation. Thus, slightly modifying the Bible verse, Hab. , Besht said, “The righteous can vivify by his faith.“ Besht's followers enlarged upon this idea and consistently deduced from it the source of divine mercy, of blessings, of life; and that therefore, if one loves him, one may partake of God's mercy.

On the opposite side of the coin, the Baal Shem Tov warned the Hasidim:
Amalek is still alive today … Every time you experience a worry or doubt about how God is running the world—that’s Amalek launching an attack against your soul. We must wipe Amalek out of our hearts whenever—and wherever—he attacks so that we can serve God with complete joy.

It may be said of Hasidism that there is no other Jewish sect in which the founder is as important as his doctrines. Besht himself is still the real center for the Hasidim; his teachings have almost sunk into oblivion. As Schechter (“Studies in Judaism,” p. 4) observes: “To the Hasidim, Baal-Shem [Besht] ... was the incarnation of a theory, and his whole life the revelation of a system.”

Teaching methods
Besht did not combat  rabbinical Judaism, but the spirit of its practice. His teachings being the result of a deep, religious temperament, he stressed the spirit. Though he considered the Law to be holy and inviolable, and he emphasized the importance of Torah-study, he held that one's entire life should be a service of God. Hasidic legend tells of a woman whom her relatives sought to kill on account of her shameful life, but who was saved in body and soul by Besht. The story is said to be characteristic of Besht's activity in healing those in need of relief. More important to him than prayer was a friendly relationship with sinners. Unselfishness and high-minded benevolence are a motif in the legends about him.

Besht's methods of teaching differed from those of his opponents. He directed many satirical remarks at them, a characteristic one being his designation of the typical Talmudist of his day as “a man who through a sheer study of the Law has no time to think about God”. Besht is reported to have illustrated his views of asceticism by the following parable:
A thief once tried to break into a house, the owner of which, crying out, frightened the thief away. The same thief soon afterward broke into the house of a very strong man, who, on seeing him enter, kept quite still. When the thief had come near enough, the man caught him and put him in prison, thus depriving him of all opportunity to do further harm.

Besht held a firm conviction that God had entrusted him with a special mission to spread his doctrines. He believed that he had heavenly visions revealing this mission to him. For him, every intuition was a divine revelation, and divine messages were daily occurrences. An example of the power of his spiritual vision is found at the beginning of his grandson's work, Degel, where he writes that his grandfather wrote to Gershon Kitover who lived in Israel, asking him why he was not in Israel that particular Shabbos.

Legends

In Hasidic tradition, there's a saying, "Someone who believes in all the stories of the Baal Shem Tov and the other mystics and holy men is a fool; someone who looks at any single story and says 'That one could not be true' is a heretic."

According to the Encyclopaedia Judaica the number of legends that are told relating to the Ba'al Shem Tov have 'distorted his historical character.' An anthology of legends about him was first compiled by Dov Baer b. Samuel of Linits, who was the son-in-law of Alexander Shoḥat, who had acted for several years as the Besht's scribe. The collection was copied many times and over time it became filled with errors.  It was printed with the title, Shivḥei ha-Besht after Dov Baer's death. It was published by Israel Jaffe who rewrote the first chapter and removed what he considered to be the distortions caused by copyists.

This edition, printed in Kopys (Kapust) in 1814, contains 230 stories grouped by common themes, characters, and motifs. Two editions also appeared in Yiddish that differ markedly from the Hebrew edition.

In the 19th century several further collections of legends about the Ba’al Shem Tov, and his followers appeared, in Hebrew and Yiddish, some of which repeated stories found in Shivḥei ha-Besht and some of which contained new stories. According to the Encyclopaedia Judaica only a few of these stories can actually be regarded as true.

One legend tells that his father, Eliezer, was seized during an attack, carried from his home in Wallachia, and sold as a slave to a prince. On account of his wisdom, he found favor with the prince, who gave him to the king to be his minister. During an expedition undertaken by the king, when other counsel failed, and all were disheartened, Eliezer's advice was accepted; and the result was a successful battle of decisive importance. Eliezer was made a general and afterward prime minister, and the king gave him the daughter of the viceroy in marriage. But, being mindful of his duty as a Jew and as he was already married, he married the princess only in name. After being questioned for a long time as to his strange conduct, he confessed to the princess that he was a Jew, who loaded him with costly presents and helped him escape to his own country.

On the way, the prophet Elijah is said to have appeared to Eliezer and said: "On account of thy piety and steadfastness, thou wilt have a son who will lighten the eyes of all Israel; and Israel shall be his name because in him shall be fulfilled the verse (Isaiah ): 'Thou art my servant, O Israel, in whom I will be glorified.'" Eliezer and his wife Sarah, however, reached old age childless and had given up all hope of ever having a child. But when they were nearly a hundred years old, the promised son (Besht) was born.

Notable students
The Baal Shem Tov directly imparted his teachings to his students, some of whom founded their own Hasidic dynasties.

  Yaakov Yosef of Polonoy (1710–1784)
 Ze'ev Wolf Kitzes of Medzhybizh (~1685–1788)
  Yechiel Michel of Zlotchov (1721–1786)
  Dov Ber of Mezeritch (1704–1772) traced to King David by way of Rabbi Yohanan, the sandal-maker and master in the Talmud
  Pinchas of Korets (1728–1790)
  Nachum Twerski of Chernobyl (1730–1797) founder of the Chernobyl Hasidic dynasty
  Leib of Shpola (1725–1812)
  Rabbi Abraham Gershon of Kitov (Kuty), brother-in-law of The Baal Shem Tov (1701–1761); descendant (possibly the grandson) of Shabbatai ha-Kohen (“the ShACh”) (1625–1663)
  Moshe Chaim Ephraim of Sudilkov (1748-1800) (his grandson)
  Boruch of Medzhybizh (1753-1811) (his grandson)
  Meir Hagadol of Premishlan (1703–1773)
  Nachman of Horodenka (d. 1765)

Confusion with Baal Shem of London

A portrait by John Singleton Copley is often mistaken to be that of Rabbi Israel ben Eliezer, also known as the Baal Shem Tov. It is, in fact, a portrait of Hayyim Samuel Jacob Falk, who was known as the Baal Shem of London.

In popular media
In 2019, American funk quartet The Fearless Flyers released an instrumental single named "The Baal Shem Tov" in honor of the rabbi.

See also
 Hasidic Judaism
 History of the Jews in Brody
 List of Hasidic dynasties
 Hasidim and Mitnagdim
 Tzavaat HaRivash
 Baal Shem Tov family tree

References

Further reading
The chief source for the Besht's biography is Ber (Dov) ben Shmuel’s Shivchei ha-Besht, Kopys, 1814, and frequently republished, and traditions recorded in the works of various Hasidic dynasties — especially by the leaders of the Chabad movement.

Jacob Joseph ha-Kohen, Toldot Yaakov Yosef
Likutim Yekarim (Likut) — a collection of Hasidic doctrines
The works of Rabbi Dov Ber of Mezeritch
 Tzava’at HaRivash, guidelines, doctrines and instructions for religio-ethical conduct
Keter Shem Tov, an anthology of his teachings, compiled mainly from the works of Jacob Joseph of Polonne and Likutim Yekarim.
Sefer Baal Shem Tov, a two-volume anthology of his teachings compiled from over 200 Hasidic texts, and constituting the most comprehensive collection.

Tzava’at HaRivash and Keter Shem Tov are anthologies and have been reprinted numerous times. Both texts have now appeared in annotated editions with corrections of the texts. (Tzva’at HaRivash 1975, fifth revised edition 1998; Keter Shem Tov - Hashalem 2004, second print 2008.) These new editions were edited by Rabbi Jacob Immanuel Schochet who also added analytical introductions, notes of sources and cross-references, commentaries, supplements and indices, and were published by the Chabad publishing house Kehot in Brooklyn NY.

Buxbaum, Yitzhak, Light and Fire of the Baal Shem Tov, Bloomsbury Academic, NY, 2005 (420 pp).
 Etkes, Immanuel, The Besht: Magician, Mystic, and Leader (The Tauber Institute Series for the Study of European Jewry) Hardcover – December 21, 2004
Dubnow, Yevreiskaya Istoria, ii. 426–431
idem, in Voskhod, viii. Nos. 5–10
Heinrich Grätz, Gesch. der Juden, 2d ed., xi. 94–98, 546–554
Jost, Gesch. des Judenthums und Seiner Sekten, iii. 185 et seq.
A. Kahana, Rabbi Yisrael Baal Shem, Jitomir, 1900
D. Kohan, in Ha-Sh. ;ar, v. 500–504, 553–554
Rodkinson, Toledot Baale Shem-Tov;ob, Königsberg, 1876
Schechter, Studies in Judaism, 1896, pp. 1–45
Zweifel, Shalom ’al-Yisrael, i.–iii.
Zederbaum, Keter Kehunah, pp. 80–103
Frumkin, ’Adat Ẓaddiḳim, Lemberg, 1860, 1865 (?)
Israel Zangwill, Dreamers of the Ghetto, pp. 221–288 (fiction).
Chapin, David A. and Weinstock, Ben, The Road from Letichev: The history and culture of a forgotten Jewish community in Eastern Europe, Volume 1.  iUniverse, Lincoln, NE, 2000.
Rabinowicz, Tzvi M. The Encyclopedia of Hasidism:  Jason Aronson, Inc., 1996.
Rosman, Moshe, Founder of Hasidism:  Univ. of Calif. Press, 1996. (Founder of Hasidism by Moshe Rosman)
Rosman, Moshe, “Miedzyboz and Rabbi Israel Baal Shem Tov”, Zion, Vol. 52, No. 2, 1987, p. 177-89. Reprinted within Essential Papers on Hasidism ed, G.D. Hundert , New York, 1991.
Schochet, Jacob Immanuel, Rabbi Israel Baal Shem Tov, Liebermann, Toronto 1961
Schochet, Jacob Immanuel, Tzava’at Harivash — The Testament of Rabbi Israel Baal Shem Tov (annotated English translation with an introduction on the history and impact of this work and the controversy it evoked in the battle between Hasidism and its opponents), Kehot, Brooklyn NY 1998. Full text provided online
Schochet, Jacob Immanuel, The Mystical Dimension, 3 volumes, Kehot, Brooklyn NY 1990 (2nd ed. 1995)
 Sears, David, The Path of the Baal Shem Tov: Early Chasidic Teachings and Customs Jason Aronson, Queens NY 1997 
Singer, Isaac Bashevis, "Reaches of Heaven: A Story of the Baal Shem Tov", Faber, 1982

External links

The Baal Shem Tov Foundation
Brief  biography
Tzava’at Harivash — The Testament of Rabbi Israel Baal Shem Tov translated to English
Baal Shem Tov minisite on chabad.org
Map of the Baal Shem Tov and his disciple’s travels from Routledge Publishing
Thirty Six Aphorisms of the Baal Shem Tov
Jewish Encyclopedia article
 by Dr. Henry Abramson
 History of Jewish Community in Medzhibozh
Beit Hatfutsot: Heroes - Trailblazers of the Jewish People

Baal Shem Tov stories
Archives of Chassidic Stories
Baal Shem Tov Foundation Story Room
Hasidic Stories — Besht
Baal Shem Tov Foundation — Library

 
Baal Shem
1698 births
1760 deaths

Year of birth uncertain
People from Ternopil Oblast
18th-century rabbis from the Ottoman Empire
Hasidic rebbes
People from Medzhybizh
Panentheists
Kabbalists
Polish Hasidic rabbis